Callispa nigritarsata, is a species of leaf beetle found in Sri Lanka.

Description
Body length is about 4.50 to 5.00 mm. Body elongate and brown. Eyes are oval and black. Antennae black and about 1.60 to 1.75 mm long. Prothorax length is about 0.80 to 1.00 mm with slightly curved anterior margin. Scutellum oblong. Elytral length is about 3.55 to 3.75 mm. Elytra oblong with ten rows of punctures at each elytron base. Hind wings which are small and brown are about 4.50 mm long. Legs are short and stout. Tarsi, femoral apex and tibiae are black. Ventrum is brown.

References 

Cassidinae
Insects of Sri Lanka
Beetles described in 1919